Drowner, Drowners or The Drowners may refer to:

Music
 The Drowners (Swedish band)
 Drowners, an American-Welsh indie rock band 
 Drowners (album), 2014
 "The Drowners", a 1992 single by Suede

Other uses
 someone who dies by drowning, or one who drowns another
 Drowner, a maintainer of a water-meadow
 The Drowner, a 1996 novel by Robert Drewe